The 1979–80 Essex Senior Football League season was the ninth in the history of Essex Senior Football League, a football competition in England.

League table

The league featured 14 clubs which competed in the league last season, along with two new clubs:
East Thurrock United, transferred from the London Spartan League
Wivenhoe Town, joined from the Essex and Suffolk Border Football League

League table

References

Essex Senior Football League seasons
1979–80 in English football leagues